Every Moment may refer to:

 Every Moment (Curt Anderson album), 2016
 Every Moment: The Best of Joy Williams, 2006